Aglaomorpha meyeniana is a species of plant in the family Polypodiaceae.  It is native to the Philippines.

References
Christopher H. Haufler, W. Andrew Grammer, E. Hennipman, Tom A. Ranker, Alan R. Smith and Harald Schneider, (2003). Systematics of the Ant-Fern Genus Lecanopteris (Polypodiaceae): Testing Phylogenetic Hypotheses with DNA Sequences. American Society of Plant Taxonomists.

External links

Aglaomorpha
Ferns of Asia
Flora of the Philippines